The Stardust Superstar of Tomorrow - Female is an annual recognition granted to female actresses in India.  The selected actress is chosen by a distinguished jury as part of the annual Stardust Magazine. The award honours a star who has made an impact with her acting and who represents new talent.

Past award winners and the films for which they won:

See also 
 Stardust Awards
 Bollywood
 Cinema of India

References 

Stardust Awards